Acalolepta ovina is a species of beetle in the family Cerambycidae. It was described by Francis Polkinghorne Pascoe in 1863, originally under the genus Monochamus. It is known from Australia.

References

Acalolepta
Beetles described in 1863